Rotundaria asperata, the Alabama orb, is a species of freshwater mussel, an aquatic bivalve mollusk.

It is native to the United States, where it is endemic to the Mobile River drainage where it is found in medium-size rivers and creeks.

This species was moved from Quadrula to Rotundaria based on genetic evidence in 2012.

References

asperata
Endemic fauna of the United States
Natural history of Alabama